Helong railway station, formerly Qingdao railway station and Sandaogou railway station, is a Chinese railway station in Helong, Yanbian, Jilin. It was founded in 1939.

References 

Railway stations in Yanbian
Railway stations in Jilin
Railway stations in China opened in 1939